Robin W. J. Langford (12 September 1953 – 22 November 2014) was an English actor, writer and director.
His acting work included with the Royal Shakespeare Theatre Company in Stratford-upon-Avon; at the Moscow Arts Theatre in Russia at the age of 12; and in his first film, The Comedians, at the age of 12, as Elizabeth Taylor’s son (with Richard Burton, Sir Alec Guinness and Sir Peter Ustinov). He subsequently played many film and television roles, as well as directed in the theatre.

Notable TV credits include the leading role in a BBC adaptation of Robert Louis Stevenson's The Black Arrow; as well as appearances in The Duchess of Duke Street, Smiley's People, The Tripods and War and Peace.

Filmography

References

External links
 

1953 births
2014 deaths
English male television actors
English male child actors
English male stage actors
20th-century English male actors
People from Cheltenham